The Curtiss C-46 Commando is a twin-engine transport aircraft derived from the Curtiss CW-20 pressurised high-altitude airliner design. Early press reports used the name "Condor III" but the Commando name was in use by early 1942 in company publicity. It was used as a military transport during World War II by the United States Army Air Forces and also the U.S. Navy/Marine Corps, which called it R5C. The C-46 served in a similar role to its Douglas-built counterpart, the C-47 Skytrain, but it was not as extensively produced as the latter.

After World War II, a few surplus C-46 aircraft were briefly used in their original role as passenger airliners but the glut of surplus C-47s dominated the marketplace and the C-46 was soon relegated to cargo duty. The type continued in U.S. Air Force service in a secondary role until 1968. The C-46 continues in operation as a rugged cargo transport for arctic and remote locations with its service life extended into the 21st century.

Design and development
The prototype for what would become the C-46, the Curtiss CW-20, was designed in 1937 by George A. Page Jr., the chief aircraft designer at Curtiss-Wright. The CW-20 was a private venture intended to compete with the four-engined Douglas DC-4 and Boeing 307 Stratoliner by the introduction of a new standard in pressurized airliners. The CW-20 had a patented fuselage conventionally referred to as a "figure-eight" (or "double-bubble"), which enabled it to better withstand the pressure differential at high altitudes. The sides of the fuselage creased at the level of the floor that separated the two portions and shared in the stress of each, rather than supporting itself. The main spar of the wing could pass through the bottom section, which was mainly intended for cargo, without intruding on the passenger upper compartment. A decision to use a twin-engine design instead of a four-engines was considered viable if sufficiently powerful engines were available, allowing for lower operating costs and a less complex structure.

Engineering work involved a three-year commitment from the company and incorporated an extensive amount of wind tunnel testing at the California Institute of Technology (Caltech). The resultant design was a large, aerodynamically "sleek" airliner, incorporating the cockpit in a streamlined glazed "dome". The engines featured a unique nacelle tunnel cowl where air was induced and expelled through the bottom of the cowl, reducing turbulent airflow and induced drag across the upper wing surface. After a mock-up was constructed in 1938, Curtiss-Wright exhibited the innovative project as a display in the 1939 New York World's Fair.

The company approached many airlines to obtain their requirements for an advanced airliner. No firm orders resulted, although 25 letters of intent were received, sufficient to begin production. The design of a 24–34 passenger airliner proceeded to prototype stage as the CW-20 at the St. Louis, Missouri facility with the initial configuration featuring twin vertical tail surfaces. Powered by two  R-2600-C14-BA2 Wright Twin Cyclones, the prototype, registered NX-19436 flew for the first time on 26 March 1940 with test pilot Edmund T. "Eddie" Allen at the controls. After testing, modifications, including the fitting of a large single tail to improve stability at low speeds were made.

The first prototype was purchased by the United States Army Air Forces (USAAF) to serve as a master for the series and was named C-55. After military evaluation, the sole example was returned to Curtiss-Wright and subsequently re-sold to the British Overseas Airways Corporation (BOAC). During testing, General Henry H. "Hap" Arnold became interested in the potential of the airliner as a military cargo transport and on 13 September 1940, ordered 46 modified CW-20As as the C-46-CU Commando; the last 21 aircraft in this order were delivered as Model CW-20Bs, called C-46A-1-CU. None of the C-46s purchased by the U.S. military were pressurized and the first 30 delivered to the AAF were sent back to the factory for 53 immediate modifications. The design was then modified to the C-46A, receiving enlarged cargo doors, a strengthened load floor and a convertible cabin that speeded changes in carrying freight and troops. The C-46 was introduced to the public at a ceremony in May 1942, attended by its designer, George A. Page Jr.

A total of 200 C-46As in two batches were ordered in 1940, although only two were actually delivered by December 7, 1941. An important change was made; more powerful 2,000 hp Pratt & Whitney R-2800 Double Wasp engines replaced the Twin Cyclones. By November 1943, 721 modifications had been made to production models, although many were minor, such as fuel system changes and fewer cabin windows were also adopted. Subsequent military contracts for the C-46A extended the production run to 1,454 examples, 40 of which were destined for the U.S. Marine Corps, to be called R5C-1. The military model was fitted with double cargo doors, a strengthened floor and a hydraulically operated cargo handling winch; 40 folding seats were the sole passenger accommodation for what was essentially a cargo hauler. Two C-46 were delivered from Higgins Industries Michoud Factory Field in 1942.

The final large production-run C-46D arrived in 1944–45, and featured single doors to facilitate paratroop drops; production totaled 1,430 aircraft. Although a one-off XC-46B experimented with a stepped windscreen and more powerful engines, a small run of 17 C-46Es had many of the same features as the XC-46B along with three-bladed Hamilton-Standard propellers replacing the standard Curtiss-Electric four-bladed units. A last contract for 234 C-46Fs reverted to the earlier cockpit shape but introduced square wing tips. A sole C-46G had the stepped windscreen and square wing tips but the end of the war resulted in the cancellation of any additional orders for the type.

Operational history

Pacific Theater
Most famous for its operations in the China-Burma-India theater (CBI) and the Far East, the Commando was a workhorse in flying over "The Hump" (as the Himalaya Mountains were nicknamed by Allied airmen), transporting desperately needed supplies to troops in China from bases in India. A variety of transports had been employed in the campaign but only the C-46 was able to handle the wide range of adverse conditions encountered by the USAAF. Unpredictably violent weather, heavy cargo loads, high mountain terrain, and poorly equipped and frequently flooded airfields proved a considerable challenge to the transport aircraft then in service, along with a host of engineering and maintenance nightmares due to a shortage of trained air and ground personnel.

After a series of mechanical problems were controlled if not surmounted, the C-46 proved its worth in the airlift operation in spite of maintenance headaches. It could carry more cargo higher than other Allied twin-engine transport aircraft in the theater, including light artillery, fuel, ammunition, parts of aircraft and, on occasion, livestock. Its powerful engines enabled it to climb satisfactorily with heavy loads, staying aloft on one engine if not overloaded, though "war emergency" load limits of up to 40,000 lbs often erased any safety margins. After the troublesome Curtiss-Electric electrically-controlled pitch mechanism on the propellers had been removed, the C-46 continued to be employed in the CBI and over wide areas of southern China throughout the war years. Even so, the C-46 was referred to by ATC pilots as the "flying coffin" with at least 31 known instances of fires or explosions in flight between May 1943 and March 1945 and many others missing and never found. Other names used by the men who flew them were "The Whale", the "Curtiss Calamity", and the "plumber's nightmare". The C-46's huge cargo volume (twice that of the C-47), three times the weight, large cargo doors, powerful engines and long range also made it suitable for the vast distances of the Pacific island campaign. In particular, the U.S. Marines found the aircraft (known as the R5C) useful in their amphibious Pacific operations, flying supplies in and wounded personnel out of numerous and hastily built island landing strips.

Europe
Although not built in the same quantities as its more famous wartime compatriot, the C-47 Skytrain, the C-46 nevertheless played a significant role in wartime operations, although the aircraft was not deployed in numbers to the European theater until March 1945. It augmented USAAF Troop Carrier Command in time to drop paratroopers in an offensive to cross the Rhine River in Germany (Operation Varsity). So many C-46s were lost in the paratroop drop during Varsity that Army General Matthew Ridgway issued an edict forbidding the aircraft's use in airborne operations. Even though the war ended soon afterwards and no further airborne missions were flown, the C-46 may well have been unfairly demonized. The operation's paratroop drop phase was flown in daylight at low speeds at very low altitudes by an unarmed cargo aircraft without self-sealing fuel tanks, over heavy concentrations of German 20 mm, 37 mm and larger caliber anti-aircraft (AA) cannon firing explosive, incendiary and armor-piercing incendiary ammunition. By that stage of the war, German AA crews had trained to a high state of readiness; many batteries had considerable combat experience in firing on and destroying high-speed, well-armed fighters and fighter-bombers while under fire themselves. Most, if not all, of the C-47s used in Operation Varsity had been fitted with self-sealing fuel tanks; the C-46s had not. Although 19 of 72 C-46 aircraft were shot down during Varsity, it is not as well known that losses of other aircraft types from AA fire during the same operation were equally as intense, including 13 gliders shot down, 14 crashed and 126 badly damaged; 15 B-24 bombers shot down and 104 badly damaged; 12 C-47s shot down, with 140 damaged.

Design shortcomings

Despite its obvious and valuable utility, the C-46 remained a maintenance nightmare throughout its AAF career. The official history of the Army Air Forces summarized its shortcomings,

But from first to last, the Commando remained a headache. It could be kept flying only at the cost of thousands of extra man-hours for maintenance and modification. Although Curtiss-Wright reported the accumulation by November 1943 of the astounding total of 721 required changes in production models, the plane continued to be what maintenance crews around the world aptly described as a "plumber's nightmare". Worse still, the plane was a killer. In the experienced hands of Eastern Air Lines and along a route that provided more favorable flying conditions than were confronted by military crews in Africa and on the Hump route into China, the plane did well enough. Indeed, Eastern Air Lines lost only one C-46 in more than two years of operation. But among the ATC pilots the Commando was known, with good reason, as the "flying coffin". From May 1943 to March 1945, Air Transport Command received reports of thirty-one instances in which C-46s caught fire or exploded in the air. Still others were listed merely as "missing in flight", and it is a safe assumption that many of these exploded, went down in flames, or crashed as the result of vapor lock, carburetor icing, or other defects.

During the war years, the C-46 was noted for an abnormal number of unexplained airborne explosions (31 between May 1943 and May 1945) that were initially attributed to various causes. In particular, the fuel system, which was quickly designed, then modified for the new, thirstier Pratt & Whitney engines, was criticized. The cause of the explosions was eventually traced to pooled gasoline from small leaks in the tanks and fuel system, combined with a spark, usually originating from open-contact electrical components. Though many service aircraft suffered small fuel leaks in use, the C-46's wings were unvented; if a leak occurred, the gasoline had nowhere to drain, but rather pooled at the wing root. Any spark or fire could set off an explosion. After the war, all C-46 aircraft received a wing vent modification to vent pooled gasoline, and an explosion-proof fuel booster pump was installed with shielded electrical selector switches in lieu of the open-contact type used originally.

Postwar
Overall, the C-46 had been successful in its primary role as a wartime cargo transport and had benefited from a series of improvements. Like the C-47/DC-3, the C-46 seemed destined for a useful career as a postwar civilian passenger airliner and was considered for that by Eastern Airlines. However, the high operating costs of the C-46 (up to 50 percent greater than the C-47), soon caused most operators to change their minds and most postwar C-46 operations were limited to commercial cargo transport and then only for certain routes. One of the C-46's failings was the prodigious fuel consumption of its powerful 2,000 hp engines, which used fuel at a much higher rate than the C-47/DC-3. Maintenance was also more intensive and costlier. Despite these disadvantages, surplus C-46s were used by some air carriers, including Capitol Airways, Flying Tigers, Civil Air Transport (CAT) and World Airways to carry cargo and passengers. Many other small carriers also eventually operated the type on scheduled and non-scheduled routes. The C-46 became a common sight in South America and was widely used in Bolivia, Peru, Brazil, Argentina and Chile, especially in mountainous areas (where a good climb rate and high service ceiling were required) or to overfly deep jungle terrain where ground transport was impracticable.

C-46 Commandos also went back to war. A dozen surplus C-46's were purchased in the United States covertly for use in Israel's 1948 war for independence and flown to Czechoslovakia in a circuitous route along South America and then across to Africa. The type's long range proved invaluable flying cargo, including desperately needed dismantled S-199 fighters from Czechoslovakia as well as other weapons and military supplies. On the return flight the C-46's would dump bombs out the cargo door on various targets at night, including Gaza, El Arish, Majdal, and Faluja (Egypt and Israel also used C-47s as bombers and transports locally). C-46's served in Korea and Vietnam for various U.S. Air Force operations, including supply missions, paratroop drops and clandestine agent transportation. The C-46 was also employed in the abortive U.S.-supported Bay of Pigs invasion in 1961. The C-46 was not officially retired from service with the U.S. Air Force until 1968.

The type served in the Central Intelligence Agency (CIA). The C-46 played a supporting role in many clandestine operations during the late 1940s and early 1950s, including supply efforts to Chiang Kai-Shek's troops battling Mao's Communists in China as well as flying cargoes of military and medical supplies to French forces via Gialam Airfield in Hanoi and other bases in French Indochina. The CIA operated its own "airline" for these operations, CAT, which was eventually renamed Air America in 1959. An Air America C-46 was the last fixed-wing aircraft flown out of Vietnam [Saigon] at the close of hostilities there. On 29 April 1975, Capt. E. G. Adams flew a 52-seat version, with 152 people on board, to Bangkok, Thailand.

The Japan Air Self-Defense Force used the Commando until at least 1978. The Republic of China Air Force operated the C-46 up until 1982 before it was retired. Although their numbers began to dwindle, C-46s continued to operate in remote locations and could be seen in service from Canada and Alaska to Africa and South America. In the late 1970s and early 1980s, the Canadian airline Lamb Air operated several C-46s from their bases in Thompson and Churchill, Manitoba. One of the largest C-46 operators was Air Manitoba, whose fleet of aircraft featured gaudy color schemes for individual aircraft. In the 1990s, these aircraft were sold to other owner/operators.  Between 1993 and 1995, Relief Air Transport operated three Canadian registered C-46s on Operation Lifeline Sudan from Lokichoggio, Kenya. These aircraft also transported humanitarian supplies to Goma, Zaire and Mogadishu, Somalia from their base in Nairobi, Kenya. One of the aircraft (C-GIXZ) was lost near Lokichoggio while the remaining two (C-GTXW & C-GIBX) eventually made their way back to Canada. These two aircraft were then operated as freighters for First Nations Transportation in Gimli, Manitoba but the airline later ceased operations with one aircraft sold to Buffalo Airways and the other tied up in receivership. According to First Nations Transport, as of Jan 2016, the latter aircraft (C-GIBX) was claimed to be airworthy with two new engines and available for sale with the fire bottles and props needing updates. The other former First Nations Transportation C-46 (C-GTXW) flew for Buffalo Airways until it was scrapped in 2015. Two aircraft of the same type (C-GPTO and C-FAVO) continue to be used by the same carrier primarily in Canada's Arctic. They have been featured on the Ice Pilots NWT television show. Prices for a used C-46 in 1960 ranged from £20,000 for a C-46F conversion, to £60,000 for a C-46R.

Variants

CW-20
Original passenger airliner design.
CW-20T
The original passenger airliner prototype, fitted with a dihedralled tailplane and endplate fins, powered by two 1,700 hp (1,268 kW) Wright R-2600 Twin Cyclone radial piston engines.
CW-20A
Company designation of the C-55.
CW-20B
Company designation of the C-46A.
CW-20B-1
Company designation of the XC-46B.
CW-20B-2
Company designation of the C-46D.
CW-20B-3
Company designation of the C-46E.
CW-20B-4
Company designation of the C-46F.
CW-20B-5
Company designation of the C-46G.
CW-20E
Company designation of the AC-46K.
CW-20G
Company designation of the XC-46C.
CW-20H
Company designation of the XC-46L.
C-55
Modification to the original CW-20T prototype, tail redesigned with a large single tail fin and rudder and an elevator with no dihedral and other improvements, including a change to Pratt & Whitney R-2800-5 radials. It was used as a C-46 military transport prototype aircraft, also designated XC-46. Later sold to BOAC
C-46 Commando
Twin engined military transport aircraft, powered by two  Pratt & Whitney R-2800-43 radial piston engines.
 Commando
Twin-engined military transport aircraft, powered by two  Pratt & Whitney R-2800-51 radial piston engines, fitted with a large cargo door on the port side of the fuselage, equipped with strengthened cargo floor, a hydraulic winch and folding seats for up to 40 troops.
TC-46A
Three C-46As converted to crew trainers.
XC-46A
A C-46A used for development tests; converted back to C-46 after tests were completed.
XC-46B Commando
One C-46A was converted into a test aircraft to evaluate a stepped windscreen design, it was powered by two 2,100 hp (1,567 kW) R-2800-34W radial piston engines with water injection.
XC-46C Commando
Redesignated from C-46G, later redesignated XC-113.
 Commando
Twin-engined personnel, paratroop transport aircraft, fitted with an extra door on the port side; 1,610 built.
TC-46D
15 C-46Ds converted to crew trainers.
C-46E Commando
17 C-46Ds modified with a large single cargo door on the port side of the fuselage, fitted with a stepped windscreen and 2,000 hp R-2800-75 engines with 3-bladed Hamilton Standard propellers.
ZC-46E
Redesignation of C-46Es in 1946.
 Commando
Twin-engined cargo transport aircraft, equipped with single cargo doors on both sides of the fuselage, fitted with square cut wingtips; 234 built.
C-46G Commando
This one-off aircraft was fitted with a stepped windscreen and square wingtips, one built.
C-46H
More powerful version of C-46F, equipped with twin tail wheels, 300 ordered but later cancelled. One C-46A was modified to C-46H standard after WWII.
C-46J
Planned update for C-46E with stepped windscreen; never ordered.

AC-46K Commando
Unbuilt version, intended to be powered by two 2,500 hp (1865-kW) Wright R-3350-BD radial piston engines.
XC-46K
Conversion project for C-46F with two 2,500 hp Wright R-3350-BD engines.
XC-46L
In 1945 three C-46As were fitted with Wright R-3350 radial piston engines.

XC-113
Engine change: One C-46G, s/n 44-78945, was converted into an engine testbed, the aircraft was fitted with a General Electric T31 turboprop in place of right hand side R-2800. The aircraft handled so poorly on the ground that it was never flown.
R5C-1
Twin-engined military transport aircraft for the U.S. Marine Corps. Similar to the C-46A Commando; 160 built.
C-46R
Riddle Airlines, of USA, conversion, with modification kit (mid-1950s) which added 40mph (64kmh) to cruising speed and 2,204 Ib (1,000 kg) to the payload. Riddle subsequently converted its own fleet of 32 to have 2,100 hp Pratt & Whitney engines. This conversion was also referred to as the Super 46C.

Operators

Military operators

 Argentine Air Force – two aircraft

 Bolivian Air Force
 Transporte Aéreo Militar

 Brazilian Air Force

 Royal Khmer Aviation (AVRK) – six aircraft

 Republic of China Air Force

 People's Liberation Army Air Force

 Colombian Air Force – one aircraft

 Cuban Air Force

 Dominican Air Force

 Ecuadorian Air Force

 Egyptian Air Force

 Haitian Air Corps

 Honduran Air Force

 Israeli Air Force

 Japan Air Self-Defense Force

 South Korean Air Force

 Royal Lao Air Force

 Mexican Air Force

 Peruvian Air Force

 Soviet Air Force – one aircraft

 United States Army Air Forces
 United States Air Force
 United States Marine Corps
 United States Navy
 Air America

Civil operators

 Aeroplan
 Aerotransportes Litoral Argentino (ALA)
 Aerovias Halcon
 Austral Lineas Aereas
 Aerolineas Carreras Transoprtes Aereos (ACTA)
 Transamerican Air Transport
 Transcontinental (TSA)

 Air Beni
 CAMBA Transportes Aéreos
 Frigorifico Santa Rita
 LAC Lineas Aereas Canedo
 Lloyd Aéreo Boliviano
 NEBA – North East Bolivian Airways
 SAO – Servicios Aéreos del Oriente
 SkyTeam Flight Training

 Aero Geral
 Aeronorte
 Aerovias Brasil
 Companhia Itaú de Transportes Aéreos
 Linha Aérea Transcontinental Brasileira
 Linhas Aéreas Paulistas – LAP
 Lóide Aéreo Nacional
 NAB – Navegação Aérea Brasileira
 Paraense Transportes Aéreos
 Real Transportes Aéreos
 Sadia
 TABA
 TAS – Transportes Aéreos Salvador
 Transportes Aéreos Nacional
 Transportes Aéreos Universal
 Varig
 VASP

 Air Manitoba
 Buffalo Airways
 Canadian Pacific Air Lines
 Commando Air Transport
 Lambair
 First Nations Transportation
 Maritime Central Airways
 Pacific Western Airlines
 World-Wide Airways

 Linea Aerea Sud Americana – LASA

 Central Air Transport Corporation
 China National Aviation Corporation

 Aerocondor Colombia
 Aeropesca Colombia
 Aerosucre
 Arca
 Avianca
 CORAL Colombia
 Líneas Aéreas La Urraca

 Congofrigo

 LACSA (Líneas Aéreas Costarricenses S.A. / Costa Rica)

 Cubana

 Carabaische Lucht Transport

 Aeromar
 Dominicana de Aviación

 Arabian American Airways
 SAIDE - Services Aériens Internationaux d'Egypte

 Lufthansa (leased from Capitol International Airways)

 Aviateca

 Air Haiti

 Servicicio Aereo de Honduras SA

 Hong Kong Airways

 Irish International Airlines (leased from Seaboard & Western Airlines)

 Arkia
 El Al

 Alitalia-Linee Aeree Italiane
 Società Aerea Mediterranea

 Air Jordan

 Relief Air Transport

 Royal Air Lao

 Lebanese International Airways

 Luxembourg Airlines

 Aigle Azur Maroc
 Royal Air Maroc

 LANICA (Líneas Aéreas de Nicaragua S.A./ Nicaragua)

 Fred Olsen Air Transport

 Paraguayan Airways Service/Servicios Aéreos del Paraguay (PAS) – 3 aircraft
 Lloyd Aéreo Paraguayo S.A. (LAPSA) – 2 aircraft
 Aerocarga Asociados (ACA) – 1 aircraft
 International Products Corporation (IPC Servicio Aéreo) – 1 aircraft

 SATCO – Servicio Aereo de Transportes Commerciales
 APSA – Aerolíneas Peruanas S.A.

 Fairline AB
 Tor-Air
 Transair Sweden

 Civil Air Transport – former operator
 Foshing Airlines

 British Overseas Airways Corporation (CW-20)

 AAXICO
 Alaska Airlines
 Braniff (Braniff International Airways)
 Capitol Air (Capitol International Airways)
 Central Airlines
 Civil Air Transport (later became Air America)
 Cordova Airlines
 Delta Air Lines
 Fairbanks Air Service
 Flying Tiger Line
 Lake Central Airlines
 National Airlines
 Northern Consolidated Airlines
 Pan American World Airways
 Reeve Aleutian Airways
 Resort Airlines
 Riddle Airlines
 Shamrock Airlines
 Seaboard World Airlines
 Tatonduk Outfitters Limited (Parent Company of Everts Air Fuel, Everts Air Cargo and Everts Air Alaska)
 Wien Alaska Airlines
 Trans Continental Airlines
 Zantop Air Transport

 ARCO Aerolíneas Colonia S.A.
 Compañía Aeronáutica Uruguaya S.A. (CAUSA)

 Avensa
 Linea Aeropostal Venezolana

Accidents and incidents

Surviving aircraft

Specifications (C-46A)

See also

References

Notes

Citations

Bibliography
 Andrade, John M. US Military Aircraft Designations and Serials. Hinckley, Leicestershire, UK: Midland Counties Publications, 1979. .
 Best, Martin S. "The Development of Commercial Aviation in China: Part 8B: Central Air Transport Corporation - Fleet Lists". Air-Britain Archive, Autumn 2009. pp. 103–118. .
 Best, Martin S. "The Development of Commercial Aviation in China: Part 10B: China National Aviation Corporation 1945–1949". Air-Britain Archive, Summer 2010. pp. 63–74. .
 Bowers, Peter M. Curtiss Aircraft, 1907–1947. London: Putnam & Company Ltd., 1979. .
 Bridgman, Leonard. Jane's All The World's Aircraft 1952–53. London: Sampson Low, Marston & Company, Ltd, 1952.
 Bridgman, Leonard. Jane's All the World's Aircraft 1958–59. London: Sampson Low, Marston & Company, Ltd., 1958.
 
 Davis, John M., Harold G. Martin and John A. Whittle. The Curtiss C-46 Commando. Tonbridge, Kent, UK: Air-Britain (Historians) Ltd., 1978. .
 Devlin, Gerard M. Paratrooper!: The Saga of Parachute And Glider Combat Troops During World War II. London: Robson Books, 1979. .
 Endres, Günter G. World Airline Fleets 1979. Hounslow, UK: Airline Publications & Sales Ltd, 1979. .
 Green, William and Gordon Swanborough. "Commando: A Dove from Curtiss-Wright". Air Enthusiast 34, September–December 1987, pp. 25–42. 
 Groves, Clinton. Propliners: A Half-Century of the World's Great Propeller-Driven Airliners (Enthusiast Color Series). Minneapolis, Minnesota: Zenith Press, 1994. .
 Hagby, Kay. Fra Nielsen & Winther til Boeing 747 (in Norwegian). Drammen, Norway. Hagby, 1998. .
 Hardesty, Von. Red Phoenix: The Rise of Soviet Air Power 1941–1945. Washington, D.C.: Smithsonian Institution, First edition 1982, 1991. .
 Johnson, E.R. "The Airliner that Went to War." Aviation History Vol. 18, no. 1, September 2007.
 Love, Terry. C-46 Commando in action. Carrollton, Texas: Squadron/Signal Publications, 2003. .
 Mondey, David. The Hamlyn Concise Guide to American Aircraft of World War II. New York: Bounty Books, 2006. .
 Mormillo, Frank B. The Other Warbird Transport: A C-46 Commando Portfolio. Air Enthusiast 87, May–June 2000, pp. 23–25. 
 Myasnikov, Avinoam and Amos Dor. Commando Story: The Life and Times of an Israeli C-46. Air Enthusiast 115, January–February 2005, pp. 76–77 
 Pereira, Aldo. Breve História da Aviação Comercial Brasileira (in Portuguese). Rio de Janeiro: Europa, 1987. .
 
 Taylor, John W. R. Jane's All the World's Aircraft 1969–70. London: Sampson Low, Marston & Company, 1969.

External links

 Illustrations in Flying Magazine January 1941 showing single versus twin-tail configurations of CW-20 prototype
 1942 Life magazine photos of loading arrangement demonstrations with the C-46

Curtiss aircraft
Curtiss C-046 Commando
World War II transport aircraft of the United States
1940s United States cargo aircraft
1940s United States airliners
Low-wing aircraft
Aircraft first flown in 1940
Twin piston-engined tractor aircraft